Richard Newdigate may refer to:
 Sir Richard Newdigate, 1st Baronet (1602–1678), MP for Tamworth 1660
 Sir Richard Newdigate, 2nd Baronet (1644–1710), MP for Warwickshire 1681–85, 1689–90
 Richard Newdigate (1679–1745), MP for Newark 1710–15

See also
 Newdigate (surname)
 Newdigate, a village in Surrey